Legislative elections were held in South Korea on 25 March 1981.

The new electoral system for the National Assembly implemented a system of proportional representation, while abolishing the president's power to appoint one-third of the chamber's members. The result was a victory for the Democratic Justice Party, which won 151 of the 276 seats in the National Assembly. Voter turnout was 77.7%.

The election was held under the influence of Coup d'état of 1979 and 1980. Major opposition political figures like Kim Young-sam were barred from running. Kim Dae-jung was arrested on May 17, 1980, and was sentenced to death on a of "inciting rebellion". Even the Democratic Republican Party of the late president Park Chung-hee was forcibly dissolved, and major figures like Kim Jong-pil was barred from running.

The election, while ostensibly a multi-party election, is widely considered to have been a fraudulent one, with supposed "opposition" politicians being heavily vetted by the Agency for National Security Planning and the South Korean Army Security Command.

Results

By city/province

References

Legislative elections in South Korea
South Korea
Legislative